Carl Damm (February 2, 1927 – December 8, 1993) was a German politician of the Christian Democratic Union (CDU) and former member of the German Bundestag.

Life 
Damm joined the CDU after 1945 and was deputy state chairman of the Hamburg CDU from 1968 to 1974. From 1953 to 1966 Damm was a member of the Hamburg State Parliament and was a member of the Hamburg-Block Parliamentary Group in the third legislative period (1953-1957). In the 1965 federal elections he was elected to the German Bundestag, of which he was a member until 1980. He had always entered parliament via the Hamburg state list.

Literature

References

1927 births
1993 deaths
Members of the Bundestag for Hamburg
Members of the Bundestag 1976–1980
Members of the Bundestag 1972–1976
Members of the Bundestag 1969–1972
Members of the Bundestag 1965–1969
Members of the Bundestag for the Christian Democratic Union of Germany
Members of the Hamburg Parliament